Arthémon Hatungimana (born January 21, 1974) is a former middle distance runner from Burundi. In 1995, he won a silver medal in 800 metres at the World Championships in Athletics.

Competition record

1Did not start in the final

Personal bests
 400 metres - 46.78 (1992)
 800 metres - 1:43.38 (2001)
1000 metres - 2:15.48 (1995)

References

External links
 

1974 births
Living people
People from Karuzi Province
Burundian male middle-distance runners
Athletes (track and field) at the 1996 Summer Olympics
Athletes (track and field) at the 2000 Summer Olympics
Athletes (track and field) at the 2004 Summer Olympics
Olympic athletes of Burundi
World Athletics Championships medalists
World Athletics Championships athletes for Burundi
African Games gold medalists for Burundi
African Games medalists in athletics (track and field)
Athletes (track and field) at the 1995 All-Africa Games
Athletes (track and field) at the 2003 All-Africa Games